Memorial is the seventh studio album by Portuguese gothic metal band Moonspell, released on 24 April 2006 by SPV/Steamhammer. The album is available in three versions: a standard edition, a Portugal exclusive with the "Phantom North" bonus track, and a limited digipak edition with the "Atlantic" bonus track.

On 16 January 2007, Memorial was certified gold by the Associação Fonográfica Portuguesa for selling over 10,000 copies in Portugal. This is the first time a Portuguese heavy metal group has received this award.

Each of the limited versions and the standard edition end with a different song, but on every version the final track ends with a six-minute wolves-howling outro ("The Sleep of the Sea"), hence there are actually two official versions of "Best Forgotten".

Track listing

CD

Special and digipak edition

Portuguese edition 

DVD (Special Edition)
Live at CC Estudio 2
 "Memento Mori"
 "Blood Tells"
 "Sanguine"
 "Best Forgotten"
Live at Vilar de Mouros
 "In Memoriam"
 "Finisterra"
 "Memento Mori"
 "Blood Tells"
 "Proliferation"
 "Upon the Blood of Men"
Videos
 "Luna"
 "Finisterra"
 "Making of Finisterra"

Vinyl edition

Personnel 
 Fernando Ribeiro – vocals
 Ricardo Amorim – guitars, keyboards
 Pedro Paixão – keyboards, samples, guitars
 Miguel Gaspar – drums

Additional musicians 
 Waldemar Sorychta – bass
 Raimund Gitsels – violin
 Birgit Zacher – female vocals on "Luna" and "Sanguine"
 Big Boss – vocals on "At the Image of Pain"

Production 
 Wojtek Blasiak – artwork, layout
 Adriano Esteves – cover art, layout
 Dennis Koehne – engineering assistant
 Siggi Bemm – engineering assistant
 Waldemar Sorychta – producer, mixing, engineering
 Paulo Moreira – photography

Charts

References 

2006 albums
Moonspell albums
SPV/Steamhammer albums
Albums produced by Waldemar Sorychta